Haint blue is a collection of pale shades of blue-green that are traditionally used to paint porch ceilings in the southern United States.

The tradition originated with the Gullah in Georgia and South Carolina. The ceiling of the slave quarters at the Owens–Thomas House in Savannah, Georgia, built in the early nineteenth century, was painted haint blue. The pigment was sourced from crushed indigo plants. Indigo was a common source for haint blue prior to the American Revolution, when indigo was a common crop for plantations in the American South, but the tradition survived well after the decline in indigo cultivation.

Etymology 
The word haint is an alternative spelling of haunt, which was historically used in African-American vernacular to refer to a ghost or, in the Hoodoo belief, a witch-like creature seeking to chase victims to their death by exhaustion.

Purpose 
Originally, haint blue was thought by the Gullah to ward haints, or ghosts, away from the home. The tactic was intended either to mimic the appearance of the sky, tricking the ghost into passing through, or to mimic the appearance of water, which ghosts traditionally could not cross. The Gullah would paint not only the porch, but also doors, window frames, and shutters. Blue glass bottles were also hung in trees to trap haints and boo hags. But while enslaved Africans of the Lowcountry and their descendants believed in the protective power of haint blue, the cultivation of indigo to produce the dye energized the 18th-century transatlantic slave trade, thereby increasing the enslavement of Africans.

As Gullah culture forcibly mingled with white southern culture, the custom became more widely practiced. The use of haint blue has lost some of its superstitious significance, but modern proponents also cite the color as a spider and wasp-deterrent. However, the color has not actually been scientifically shown to stave off bugs. The associated repellent effect may stem from the use of milk paint containing lye, which does act as an insect repellent. The blue color is also appreciated from an aesthetic standpoint for mimicking the color of the sky.

See also 

 Robin egg blue

References

African-American society
Culture of the Southern United States
Gullah culture
Shades of blue
Gullah mythology
Superstitions of the United States